Villecresnes is a commune in the southeastern suburbs of Paris, France.

Transport
Villecresnes is served by no station of the Paris Métro, RER, or suburban rail network. The closest station to Villecresnes is Boissy-Saint-Léger station on Paris RER line A. This station is located in the neighboring commune of Boissy-Saint-Léger,  from the town center of Villecresnes.

Population

Education 
Schools in the commune include: 
 Three public preschools (maternelles): du Château, des Fleurs, du Réveillon 
 One public group of preschools/elementary schools: Mélanie Bonis
 One public elementary school: des Merles
 One public junior high school: Collège public La Guinette
 A private preschool: Le Petit cours

For high school students attend Lycée public Guillaume Budé in nearby Limeil-Brévannes.

Notable residents
William Irigoyen (born 1970), journalist, born in Villecresnes
Alexandra Lamy (born 1971), French actress, born in Villecresnes

Twin towns
  Zibido San Giacomo, Italia since 2010
  Weißenhorn, Germany since 2010

See also
Communes of the Val-de-Marne department

References

External links

Villecresnes official website

Communes of Val-de-Marne